Sweet Magnolias is an American romantic drama streaming television series, developed by Sheryl J. Anderson and based on the Sweet Magnolias novels by Sherryl Woods. It stars JoAnna Garcia Swisher, Brooke Elliott, Heather Headley and Jamie Lynn Spears. The series premiered on Netflix on May 19, 2020. In July 2020, the series was renewed for a second season. The 10-episode second season premiered on February 4, 2022. In May 2022, the series was renewed for a third season.

Premise
Sweet Magnolias follows "three South Carolina women, best friends since childhood, as they shepherd each other through the complexities of romance, career, and family."

Cast and characters

Main

 JoAnna Garcia Swisher as Maddie Townsend, a recently separated woman with three children in Serenity, South Carolina who is trying to get back in the workforce while going through a divorce with her husband, Bill. She is part of a friend group that calls themselves Sweet Magnolias.
 Brooke Elliott as Dana Sue Sullivan, a chef, and owner of a restaurant called Sullivan's. She is Helen's and Maddie's best friend and part of the Sweet Magnolias
 Heather Headley as Helen Decatur, an accomplished attorney. She is Dana Sue's and Maddie's best friend, and one of the Sweet Magnolias. She bought a mansion which she converted into The Corner Spa with Maddie and Dana Sue
 Logan Allen as Kyle Townsend, Maddie and Bill's younger son who is a freshman at Serenity High School with a talent for acting. He had a crush on Annie, but later shows interest in Nellie Lewis
 Anneliese Judge as Annie Sullivan, Dana Sue's daughter. She is friends with the Townsend brothers and an avid photographer. She has a crush on Tyler, whom she kissed after having too much to drink at a party, and is oblivious to Kyle's feelings. Annie is pursued by Jackson, whom she later ends up dating.
 Carson Rowland as Tyler "Ty" Townsend, Maddie and Bill's eldest son who is a junior at Serenity High School and a star pitcher on his high school baseball team
 Justin Bruening as Cal Maddox, Ty's baseball coach and Maddie's new love interest. He is a former professional baseball player
 Chris Klein as Bill Townsend, Maddie's ex-husband and a family doctor at Serenity Family Physicians
 Jamie Lynn Spears as Noreen Fitzgibbons, Bill's pregnant fiancée, a nurse in his office who became his mistress
 Dion Johnstone as Erik Whitley (season 2; recurring season 1), the sous chef at Sullivan's and a mentor to Isaac
 Brandon Quinn as Ronnie Sullivan (season 2; guest season 1), Dana Sue's estranged husband and Annie's father

Recurring

 Chris Medlin as Isaac Downey, a member of the kitchen staff at Sullivan's. He recently moved to Serenity to find his birth father and mother. We later discover that his parents are Peggy and Bill
 Bianca Berry Tarantino as Katie Townsend, Maddie and Bill's only daughter and youngest child
 Frank Oakley III as Harlan Bixby, the assistant coach of Serenity High School	baseball team
 Allison Gabriel as Mary Vaughn Lewis, the mayor's wife and adversary of the Sweet Magnolias
 Simone Lockhart as Nellie Lewis, Mary Vaughn's daughter. She has a crush on Kyle
 Brittany L. Smith as Peggy Martin
 Tracey Bonner as Pastor June Wilkes
 Charles Lawlor as Collins Littlefield
 Harlan Drum as Caroline "CeCe" Matney, Ty's love interest
 Sam Ashby as Jackson Lewis, Ty's baseball rival teammate and Mary Vaughn's son
 Hunter Burke as Trotter Vidhyarkorn, Cal's best friend who works at The Corner Spa as a yoga instructor
 Al-Jaleel Knox as Gabe Weatherspoon, Ty's best friend and baseball teammate
 Michael Shenefelt as Ryan Wingate, Helen's on-and-off boyfriend
 Michael May as Simon Spry, Annie's friend
 Caroline Lagerfelt as Paula Vreeland, Maddie's Mom
 Chase Anderson as Jeremy Reynolds, Dana Sue's suitor

Episodes

Series overview

Season 1 (2020)

Season 2 (2022)

Production

Development
On September 27, 2018, it was announced that Netflix had given the production a series order for a first season consisting of ten episodes. The series was based on the Sweet Magnolias book series by Sherryl Woods and executive producers were expected to include Woods, Sheryl J. Anderson, and Dan Paulson. Anderson was also set to serve as the series' showrunner. Production companies involved with the series were slated to consist of Daniel L. Paulson Productions. The series premiered on May 19, 2020. Norman Buckley directed six of the episodes and served as co-executive producer. On July 23, 2020, Netflix renewed the series for a second season which premiered on February 4, 2022. On May 4, 2022, Netflix renewed the series for a third season.

Casting
On May 20, 2019, Monica Potter, Brooke Elliott, and Heather Headley were announced as the leads. On July 1, 2019, it was reported that Chris Klein, Jamie Lynn Spears, and Justin Bruening had joined the cast as series regulars. On August 1, 2019, JoAnna Garcia Swisher was cast as Maddie Townsend, replacing Potter who was originally cast as the lead. On May 4, 2021, Dion Johnstone and Brandon Quinn were promoted to series regulars for second season.

Filming
Principal photography for the series began on July 8, 2019 in Covington, Georgia. The second season began filming in April 2021 and wrapped up in July 2021. Season 3 began filming in July 2022.

Reception

For the first season, Review aggregator Rotten Tomatoes reported an approval rating of 78% based on 9 reviews, with an average rating of 6.2/10.

In its first 30-days on Netflix, season 2 was watched globally on Netflix for 161.3 million hours.

Notes

References

External links
 
 

2020 American television series debuts
2020s American drama television series
2020s American romance television series
2020s romantic drama television series
American romantic drama television series
English-language Netflix original programming
Television shows based on American novels
Television shows set in South Carolina